Giantommaso Gastaldi, O.P. (1597–1655) was a Roman Catholic prelate who served as Bishop of Brugnato (1652–1655).

Biography
Giantommaso Gastaldi was born in Alassio Albinganen, Italy in 1597 and ordained a priest in the Order of Preachers.
On 26 August 1652, he was appointed during the papacy of Pope Innocent X as Bishop of Brugnato.
On 1 September 1652, he was consecrated bishop by Fabio Chigi, Cardinal-Priest of Santa Maria del Popolo, with Ranuccio Scotti Douglas, Bishop Emeritus of Borgo San Donnino, and Carlo Carafa della Spina, Bishop of Aversa, serving as co-consecrators. 
He served as Bishop of Brugnato until his death in 1655.

References

External links and additional sources
 (for Chronology of Bishops) 
 (for Chronology of Bishops) 

17th-century Italian Roman Catholic bishops
Bishops appointed by Pope Innocent X
1597 births
1655 deaths
Dominican bishops